Thomas McKenna may refer to:

 T. P. McKenna (1929–2011), Irish actor
 Thomas McKenna (trade unionist) (1876–1939), British trade union leader
 Thomas P. McKenna (born 1930), American Army officer and author

See also
 Tom McKenna (disambiguation)